Jackson Campbell Fear (13 January 197821 July 2006) was an Australian archer born in Sydney, New South Wales.

Archery career
Fear finished 35th in the individual competition at the 1996 Summer Olympics, behind teammate Matthew Gray (26th) and ahead of Simon Fairweather (52nd).  The Australian team (Gray, Fear and Fairweather) finished 4th after losing to South Korea in the semi-finals.

Fear was in line for selection for the 2000 Summer Olympics, but was forced out after testing positive to cannabis at the Australian Championships in May 2000.  He admitted to using the drug and was suspended from competition for two years.

In 2004 he was charged with 14 counts of internet fraud on eBay, and with trafficking, possession and use of cannabis.

He committed suicide on 21 July 2006.

See also
Archery at the 1996 Summer Olympics
Australia at the 1996 Summer Olympics

References

External links
Australian Olympic Committee Profile

1978 births
2006 suicides
Archers at the 1996 Summer Olympics
Olympic archers of Australia
Australian male archers
Australian people of English descent
Australian people of Welsh descent
Suicides in Australia